In computing, XCOPY is a command used on IBM PC DOS, MS-DOS, IBM OS/2, Microsoft Windows, FreeDOS, ReactOS, and related operating systems for copying multiple files or entire directory trees from one directory to another and for copying files across a network.

Overview
XCOPY stands for extended copy, and was created as a more functional file copying utility than the copy command found in earlier operating systems. XCOPY first appeared in DOS 3.2.

While still included in Windows 10, XCOPY has been deprecated in favor of robocopy, a more powerful copy tool, which is now supplied with the Microsoft Windows Server and Desktop operating systems.

DR DOS 6.0 and Datalight ROM-DOS include an implementation of the  command.

The FreeDOS version was developed by Rene Ableidinger and is licensed under the GPL.

J. Edmeades developed the Wine-compatible version that is included in ReactOS. It is licensed under the LGPL.

Compression
Since Windows Server 2019 and Windows 10, a compression option is available in xcopy when copying across a network. With this switch, if the destination computer supports SMB compression and the files being copied are very compressible, there may be significant improvements to performance. The SMB compression adds inline whitespace compression to file transfers. Compression is also available with the robocopy command and Hyper-V Live Migration with SMB.

Example
Create a new directory by copying all contents of the existing directory, including any files or subdirectories having the hidden or system attributes and empty directories.

xcopy e:\existing e:\newcopy /e /i /h

If the pathnames include spaces, they must be enclosed in quotation marks.

xcopy "D:\Documents and Settings\MY.USERNAME\My Documents\*" "E:\MYBACKUP\My Documents\" /D/E/C/Y

Copy entire drive in to a mapped network drive while ignoring any errors in network restartable mode.

xcopy *.* z:\Netmirror /E /V /C /F /H /Y /Z  1>out.txt 2>err.txt

Copy a single file without prompt if it is a file or a directory

cmd /c echo F | xcopy "c:\directory 1\myfile" "c:\directory 2\myfile"

Limitations
XCOPY fails with an "insufficient memory" error when the path plus filename is longer than 254 characters. An option "/J" copies files without buffering;
moving very large files without the option (available only after Server 2008R2) can consume all available RAM on a system.

No open files
XCOPY will not copy open files. Any process may open files for exclusive read access by withholding the FILE_SHARE_READ
https://msdn.microsoft.com/en-us/library/aa363858.aspx

XCOPY does not support the Windows Volume Shadow Copy service which effectively allows processes to have access to open files, so it is not useful for backing up live operating system volumes.

XCOPY deployment
XCOPY deployment or xcopy installation is a software application's installation into a Microsoft Windows system simply by copying files. The name is derived from the XCOPY command line facility provided by Microsoft operating systems.

In contrast, the installation of a typical Windows application will require a significant number of additional steps before the application is ready to be used. Most of this additional work involves, directly or indirectly, adding or modifying entries in the Windows Registry. Even when an application uses ordinary files for its own data, many common facilities provided by Windows require some type of registration step before they are available to programs. Usually, one or more specialized tools (such as Windows Installer, InnoSetup, or NSIS) are used to help coordinate these relatively complex operations.

See also
List of file copying software
List of DOS commands
Peripheral Interchange Program
Software deployment

References

Further reading

External links

xcopy | Microsoft Docs
Switches That You Can Use with Xcopy and Xcopy32 Commands, Windows 95, Windows 98, Windows Me
Xcopy, Microsoft Windows XP
VariableGHz article depicting CRC errors and XCOPY as a solution
XCOPY Command in a post build event does not execute
XP_CMDSHELL Does Not Work with XCOPY
See also Microsoft Product Documentation
How to deploy an ASP.NET Web application using Xcopy deployment
.NET Development: Determining When to Use Windows Installer Versus XCOPY
Visual C++ How to: Deploy using XCopy

External DOS commands
File copy utilities
MSX-DOS commands
OS/2 commands
ReactOS commands